Mordecai Sheftall (December 2, 1735 – July 6, 1797) was a Georgia merchant who served as a colonel in the Continental Army during the American Revolutionary War and was the highest ranking Jewish officer of the Colonial forces. He was born in Savannah, Province of Georgia, to Benjamin and Perla Sheftall, who had arrived in 1733 to the Georgia colony on the William and Sarah from London, England, with a few dozen members of other Jewish immigrant families. The Sheftalls were founding among the members of Congregation Mickve Israel. Sheftall was buried at the Mordecai Sheftall Cemetery, in Savannah, Georgia.

Biography
Mordecai was born on December 2, 1735, to Perla and Benjamin Sheftall. When he was three years old, his mother died. His father remarried within a year to Hannah Sheftall (née Solomons). His half-brother Levi was born in 1739, with another half-brother, Solomon, being born in 1741. However, he died in 1743, at just two years of age. Mordecai left school at the age of eleven, as there was a severe lack of schools, with his father continuing his Jewish education. Upon his bar mitzvah, he ordered tefillin and s'farim for his son from England. The order arrived slightly late, and his father became worried that the ship holding the tefillin and s'farim got lost at sea or was captured by an "enemy" vessel. England was in middle of King George's war at the time, so he was probably talking about the French when he referred to an "enemy." Sheftall went into business by the time he was seventeen, and was making a nice profit buying, tanning, and then selling deerskin. When he was eighteen, he had made enough money to purchase fifty acres of land near Savannah. By his mid twenties, he was doing business with companies from the Caribbean, Charleston, and Philadelphia, making substantial sums of money. In 1761, when he was twenty-six, Sheftall married Frances Fannie (Freidel) (née Hart, (1740–1820).   Together, they had six children: Sheftall, Benjamin, Elias, Moses, Perla and Esther,; Elias died as a baby. Not long after his marriage, Sheftall began to raise cattle and horses on a 2,000-acre farm with nine slaves. Also on the property was a tanning facility that he made with his half-brother Levi.

Revolutionary War

From the outbreak of the Revolution Sheftall was prominently identified with the Patriot cause, vocally opposing the 1765 Stamp Act imposed by the British Parliament. He became chairman of "the Parochial Committee," organized to regulate the internal affairs of Savannah, and composed of patriots opposed to the royal government; his appointment has been taken by some to indicate the level of high standing Sheftall enjoyed among both Jews and Gentiles. In 1777 Sheftall was appointed commissary-general to the troops of Georgia and to the Continental troops also; in October of the following year he became "Deputy Commissary of Issues in South Carolina and Georgia"; and he figured as a staff-officer in the Continental line of the Georgia brigade during the war. Major General Robert Howe gave him the rank of colonel as a result. Sheftall appointed his son Sheftall as his assistant. When the British attacked Savannah in late 1778, Sheftall not only took an active part in its defense, but he also advanced considerable sums of money (including loans) for the American cause. After the city had been taken, he and his son were captured by the British. As a consequence of refusing to renounce his loyalty to the Patriot cause, the British took him to the prison ship Nancy with his son Sheftall and kept him there as a prisoner of war.

On the ship, he refused to eat the pork the British gave to him, due to his keeping of kosher dietary restrictions. To taunt him, his British captors ordered his cutlery be smeared in pork grease, knowing he would refuse to use it. While Sheftall was on the ship, another prisoner jumped overboard in an attempt to escape. The man drowned, and his body was brought back on the ship. Sheftall offered to pay almost all the money he had to have the man buried. On February 25, 1779, Sheftall was told he would be released. He actually was released that June. However, on his way north, he was captured again, and exiled to the Caribbean island of Antigua. Sheftall, however, negotiated a prisoner exchange, and was released in April 1780. Due to the British presence in Savannah, Sheftall and Sheftall traveled to New York, before moving to Philadelphia. 

The British had seized his property during their occupation of Savannah, and his loans that he gave for the defense of Georgia were never paid back. However, he opened a shipping business from Philadelphia, and tried his hand at privateering, in 1781. The latter failed, but he was called back to Georgia the same year, to Agent for the State of Georgia for Purchasing Clothing. In 1782, he was a witness at the court-martial of Robert Howe, where it was being decided if he was at fault for failing to defend Savannah, back in 1779. With the British leaving Savannah on July 11, that same year, Sheftall returned to his Savannah and his family.

Religious life
Sheftall was an observant Jew.  For several years the only Jewish place of worship in Savannah was a room fitted up by him in his own house, where services were held until about 1774. In 1773 he deeded a piece of land for the purpose of erecting a synagogue, but the project was abandoned owing to the incipient war with Great Britain. He and his brother Levi also donated the land for the Savannah Jewish cemetery, which was known for decades as the "Sheftall cemetery." In 1782, in Philadelphia, Sheftall helped build the synagogue for the Congregation Mikveh Israel. In 1790, Sheftall became president of Congregation Mickve Israel, a position he held for five years.

Death 
Sheftall died on July 6, 1797. The US government never repaid the loans he made during the war, though he did receive some extra land.

References

External links
 
 Guide to the Papers of Mordecai Sheftall (1735-1797), undated, 1761-1867, 1873, 1932, 1941 (bulk 1777-1778) at the American Jewish Historical Society, New York, NY.
 Guide to the Levi Sheftall Family Papers at the Hargrett Rare Book and Manuscript Library, University of Georgia. Includes correspondence with Mordecai Sheftall.
 Photographs of the Colonial Jewish Cemetery in Savannah, GA

1735 births
1797 deaths
American Ashkenazi Jews
People from Savannah, Georgia
Continental Army officers from Georgia (U.S. state)
Jewish American military personnel
Jewish-American slave owners
Burials in Georgia (U.S. state)
Jewish American people in Georgia (U.S. state) politics
Jews and Judaism in Savannah